The BFI TV 100 is a list of 100 television programmes or series that was compiled in 2000 by the British Film Institute (BFI), as chosen by a poll of industry professionals, with the aim to determine the best British television programmes of any genre that had been screened up to that time.

Selection and criteria

The British Film Institute television programme poll was conducted in the year 2000, and its results are reflected in the list that appears in a following section. Initially, a 'big list' of 650 programmes was drawn up by BFI personnel. Television programmes no longer extant in the archives were excluded from consideration. The provisional list was split into six categories: Single Dramas, Drama Series and Serials, Comedy and Variety, Factual, Children's/Youth, and Lifestyle & Light Entertainment. Some programmes were represented in the list by an entire series; however, for some series—e.g., the anthology The Wednesday Play and the current affairs programme This Week—individual episodes were listed. News stories were mostly excluded, with exceptions such as the coverage of the death of Diana, Princess of Wales (on the basis that it would be impossible to determine whether it was the coverage or the news itself that made them important). Sport was excluded for similar reasons, and also because many events such as the 1966 World Cup, while important to those in England, would not necessarily matter to those in other areas of the UK.

The provisional list of 650 was then distributed to 1,600 television industry professionals in the UK, who were each given 30 votes. Each voter was required to cast a minimum of three votes in every category. The judges were also asked to name their top overseas programme (where the U.S. sitcom, Frasier, was chosen).

Full list 

The following are the results of the poll, as reported by the BFI and other sources. Because the list reports decisions made in the year 2000, programmes and series are presented as they were perceived in that year; as such, ones not yet having concluded by the year 2000 are presented as having an open-ended date span in the "Year(s)" column, even if they have subsequently ended. The Genre column, added to the original table, may have a lot of crossover genres and is intended as guide to the "main" genre of each programme.

BBC led broadcasters in terms of numbers of programmes/series produced, with 70. Granada Television was the second most represented with 7, and Thames Television and Channel 4 tied for third with 6 each. Central produced four of the listed titles, while ATV produced two, and London Weekend Television, ABC Weekend TV and Associated-Rediffusion produced one each.

See also
 Britain's Best Sitcom
 100 Greatest
 BFI Top 100 British films

References

Further reading and viewing
 
  BBC News article regarding the list, and giving the first 20 on the list.

External links
British TV guide

British television-related lists
TV 100
2000 in British television
Top television lists
British television awards